"You Can Do Magic" is a song by singer-songwriter Russ Ballard that was recorded as a 1982 single by folk rock duo America from their album View from the Ground.

The song was one of two Ballard compositions on View from the Ground, the other being "Jody". Ballard wrote both songs specifically for America at the behest of Rupert Perry, A&R vice president for Capitol Records. Ballard also produced the tracks marking a return to record production after a four-year hiatus; although Ballard had earlier hits as a songwriter, "You Can Do Magic" was his first major hit credit as a producer.

"You Can Do Magic" proved a solid comeback vehicle for America whose last Top 40 hit—"Today's the Day"—had occurred in 1976; the second of two subsequent appearances on the Hot 100 was in 1979. "You Can Do Magic" returned America to the Top 40 in August 1982 with the track reaching No. 8 that October, and holding that position for five weeks. The popularity of "You Can Do Magic" was paralleled by the success of the parent View From the Ground album which rose to No. 41 on Billboard listing of the top 200 albums, the first time an album by America as a duo (rather than the original trio) had appeared in that chart's upper half.

International chart placings for "You Can Do Magic" include No. 30 in Australia, No. 37 in Canada, No. 20 in Ireland, No. 27 in Italy, No. 12 in New Zealand, and No. 59 in the UK.

The success of "You Can Do Magic" led to America recording their 1983 album Your Move with Russ Ballard as producer.

Chart performance

Weekly charts

Year-end charts

Music video
The music video opens up with a gloved hand throwing glitter, which then pixelates into the band performing the song, amidst a cloudy background. Some shots feature a set of hands flipping cards (referencing the classic magic trick). On 17 July 2019, the video was officially uploaded on YouTube.

Personnel
America
Gerry Beckley – lead vocals
Dewey Bunnell – vocals

Backing musicians
Russ Ballard – acoustic, electric and bass guitars, keyboards  and backing vocals
Chuck Kirkpatrick - additional backing vocals
Willie Leacox - drums

See also
 List of Billboard Hot 100 top 10 singles in 1982

References

1982 songs
1982 singles
Songs written by Russ Ballard
America (band) songs
Capitol Records singles
Song recordings produced by Russ Ballard